Dusk was a Canadian English language specialty channel. Dusk broadcast programming consisting of films, television dramas, and reality TV, and documentary-style television series from the thriller, suspense and supernatural genres.

Dusk went on the air on September 7, 2001, as Scream (stylized as SCREAM), under the ownership of Corus Entertainment and Alliance Atlantis as a Category 2 service. During its early years, Scream broadcast horror, thriller, and suspense films along with some television series. After the acquisition of Alliance Atlantis by Canwest and Goldman Sachs, the channel was rebranded as Dusk in 2009, shifting more towards suspense and paranormal-themed programming rather than pure horror to appeal to a wider audience.

Two years after Canwest was sold to Shaw Media, a sister company of Corus, the channel ended operations in March 2012 and was largely replaced on most providers by ABC Spark.

History
In November 2000, Corus, on behalf of a corporation to be incorporated, was approved by the Canadian Radio-television and Telecommunications Commission (CRTC) to launch a television channel called HorrorVision, which would be devoted primarily to the horror and thriller genres.

The channel was launched as Scream on September 7, 2001, as a joint venture between Corus Entertainment and Alliance Atlantis. Programming on Scream focused primarily on horror, thriller, suspense films and television series. 

On January 18, 2008, a joint venture between Canwest and Goldman Sachs Capital Partners known as CW Media, acquired 49% of Scream through its purchase of Alliance Atlantis' broadcasting assets, which were placed in a trust in August 2007.

On September 9, 2009, Scream was re-launched as Dusk, shifting away from horror and "gore" to focus more broadly on paranormal and suspense-driven programming (such as Supernatural and mainstream film premieres such as Along Came a Spider), to appeal to a broader viewer demographic such as women.

On October 27, 2010, ownership changed once again as Shaw Communications gained a 49% stake in Scream as a result of its acquisition of Canwest and Goldman Sachs' interest in CW Media.

On February 10, 2012, Dusk revealed through an announcement via its Twitter and Facebook accounts, that it would be ceasing operations on March 23, 2012. A statement later announced on the channel's website stated the channel was being shuttered for strategic reasons to concentrate on "areas of expertise." Corus later indicated more specifically, through CRTC filings, that Dusk was discontinued to proceed with the launch of ABC Spark, such that Shaw Cable and Shaw Direct could carry the latter while complying with the CRTC's "3:1 ratio" policy (which limits the proportion of speciality channels carried from companies affiliated with a particular service provider).

The last program aired on Dusk was the 1990 film Ghost, which was aired in a 24-hour marathon on March 22. As before the movie was finished, the network either signed off the air by going dark or changed over to ABC Spark at 6:00 am ET on March 23.

Epilogue
Dusk was Canada's first horror television channel dedicated to the thriller, suspense and horror genres and was one of the most-watched new speciality channels.

After Dusk's closure, another attempt to launch a horror-based channel took place five years later when  Sylvain Gagné, owner of IO Média inc., launched Frissons TV in September 2017 with its English counterpart, Terror TV to be launched.

References

Digital cable television networks in Canada
Former Corus Entertainment networks
Movie channels in Canada
Television channels and stations established in 2001
Television channels and stations disestablished in 2012
2001 establishments in Canada
2012 disestablishments in Canada
Defunct television networks in Canada